The Delaware River is a major river in the Mid-Atlantic region of the United States, forming the border between Pennsylvania and Delaware (on its western shore) and New Jersey on its eastern shore.

From the meeting of its branches in Hancock, New York, the river flows for  along the borders of New York, Pennsylvania, New Jersey, and Delaware, before emptying into Delaware Bay. It is the longest free-flowing river in the Eastern United States.

The river has been recognized by the National Wildlife Federation as one of the country's Great Waters.

The river has two branches that rise in the Catskill Mountains of New York: the West Branch at Mount Jefferson in Jefferson, Schoharie County, and the East Branch at Grand Gorge, Delaware County. The branches merge to form the main Delaware River at Hancock, New York. Flowing south, the river remains relatively undeveloped, with  protected as the Upper, Middle, and Lower Delaware National Scenic Rivers. At Trenton, New Jersey, the Delaware becomes tidal, navigable, and significantly more industrial. This section forms the backbone of the Delaware Valley metropolitan area, serving the port cities of Philadelphia, Camden, New Jersey, and Wilmington, Delaware.

Before the arrival of European settlers, the river was the homeland of the Lenape Native Americans. They called the river Lenapewihittuk, or Lenape River, and Kithanne, meaning the largest river in this part of the country.

In 1609, the river was visited by a Dutch East India Company expedition led by Henry Hudson. Hudson, an English navigator, was hired to find a western route to Cathay (China), but his discoveries set the stage for Dutch colonization of North America in the 17th century. Early Dutch and Swedish settlements were established along the lower section of the river and Delaware Bay. Both colonial powers called the river the South River (Zuidrivier), compared to the Hudson River, which was known as the North River. After the English expelled the Dutch and took control of the New Netherland colony in 1664, the river was renamed Delaware after Sir Thomas West, 3rd Baron De La Warr, an English nobleman and the Virginia colony's first royal governor who defended the colony during the First Anglo-Powhatan War.

Origin of the name

The Delaware River is named in honor of Thomas West, 3rd Baron De La Warr (1577–1618), an English nobleman and the Virginia colony's first royal governor, who defended the colony during the First Anglo-Powhatan War. Lord de la Warr waged a punitive campaign to subdue the Powhatan after they had killed the colony's council president, John Ratcliffe, and attacked the colony's fledgling settlements. Lord de la Warr arrived with 150 soldiers in time to prevent the colony's original settlers at Jamestown from giving up and returning to England and is credited with saving the Virginia colony. The name of the barony (later an earldom) is pronounced as in the current spelling form "Delaware" and is thought to derive from French de la Guerre.

It has often been reported that the river and bay received the name "Delaware" after English forces under Richard Nicolls expelled the Dutch and took control of the New Netherland colony in 1664. However, the river and bay were known by the name Delaware as early as 1641. The state of Delaware was originally part of the William Penn's Pennsylvania colony. In 1682, the Duke of York granted Penn's request for access to the sea and leased him the territory along the western shore of Delaware Bay, which became known as the "Lower Counties on the Delaware". In 1704, the Lower Counties were given political autonomy to form a separate provincial assembly, but they shared Pennsylvania's provincial governor until the two colonies separated on June 15, 1776, and they remained separate as states after the establishment of the United States.

The name "Delaware" also came to be used as a collective name for the Lenape, a Native American people who inhabited an area of the basins of the Susquehanna River, Delaware River, and lower Hudson River in the northeastern United States at the time of European settlement, as well as for their language. As a result of disruption following the French and Indian War, American Revolutionary War, and the later Indian removals from the eastern United States, the name "Delaware" has been spread with the Lenape's diaspora to municipalities, counties and other geographical features in the American Midwest and Canada.

Watershed

This total area constitutes approximately 0.4% of the land mass in the United States. In 2001, the watershed was 18% agricultural land, 14% developed land, and 68% forested land.

There are 216 tributary streams and creeks comprising an estimated 14,057 miles of streams and creeks, in the watershed.  While the watershed is home to 4.17 million people according to the 2000 Federal Census, these bodies of water provide drinking water to 17 million people—roughly 6% of the population of the United States.  The waters of the Delaware River's basin are used to sustain "fishing, transportation, power, cooling, recreation, and other industrial and residential purposes." It is the 33rd largest river in the United States in terms of flow, but is among the nation's most heavily used rivers in daily freight tonnage. The average annual flow rate of the Delaware is 11,700 cubic feet per second at Trenton, New Jersey. With no dams or impediments on the river's main stem, the Delaware is one of the few remaining large free-flowing rivers in the United States.

Course

West Branch of the Delaware

The last  forms part of the boundary between New York and Pennsylvania.

The branch flows generally southwest, entering Delaware County and flowing through the towns of Stamford and Delhi. In southwestern Delaware County it flows in an increasingly winding course through the mountains, generally southwest. At Stilesville the West Branch was impounded in the 1960s to form the Cannonsville Reservoir, the westernmost of the reservoirs in the New York City water system. It is the most recently constructed New York City reservoir and began serving the city in 1964. This water flows over halfway through the reservoir to enter the  West Delaware Tunnel in Tompkins, New York. Then it flows through the aqueduct into the Rondout Reservoir, where the water enters the  Delaware Aqueduct, that contributes to roughly 50% of the city's drinking water supply. At Deposit, on the border between Broome and Delaware counties, it turns sharply to the southeast and is paralleled by New York State Route 17.

East Branch of the Delaware

Similarly, the East Branch begins from a small pond south of Grand Gorge in the town of Roxbury in Delaware County, flowing southwest toward its impoundment by New York City to create the Pepacton Reservoir, the largest reservoir in the New York City water supply system. Its tributaries are the Beaver Kill River and the Willowemoc Creek which enter into the river  before the West Branch meets the East Branch. The confluence of the two branches is just south of Hancock.

The East Branch and West Branch of the Delaware River parallel each other, both flowing in a southwesterly direction.

Upper Delaware Valley
From Hancock, New York, the Delaware flows between the northern Poconos in Pennsylvania, and the lowered shale beds north of the Catskills. The river flows down a broad Appalachian valley, passing Hawk's Nest overlook on the Upper Delaware Scenic Byway. The river flows southeast for 78 miles through rural regions along the New York-Pennsylvania border to Port Jervis and  Shawangunk Ridge.

The Minisink

At Port Jervis, New York, it enters the Port Jervis trough.
The Minisink is a buried valley where the Delaware flows in a bed of glacial till that buried the eroded bedrock during the last glacial period. It then skirts the Kittatinny ridge, which it crosses at the Delaware Water Gap, between nearly vertical walls of sandstone, quartzite, and conglomerate, and then passes through a quiet and charming country of farm and forest, diversified with plateaus and escarpments, until it crosses the Appalachian plain and enters the hills again at Easton, Pennsylvania.

The Appalachian Trail, which traverses the ridge of Kittatinny Mountain in New Jersey, and Blue Mountain in Pennsylvania, crosses the Delaware River at the Delaware Water Gap near Columbia, New Jersey.

Central Delaware Valley
In Easton, Pennsylvania, the Lehigh River joins the Delaware.

Lower Delaware and Tidewater

Below Trenton, the Delaware flows between Philadelphia and New Jersey before becoming a broad, sluggish inlet of the sea, with many marshes along its side, widening steadily into its great estuary, Delaware Bay.

The Delaware River constitutes the boundary between Delaware and New Jersey. The Delaware-New Jersey border is actually at the easternmost river shoreline within the Twelve-Mile Circle of New Castle, rather than at mid-river, mid-channel or thalweg, so small portions of land lying west of the shoreline, but on the New Jersey side of the river, are pene-exclaves under the jurisdiction of Delaware. The rest of the borders follow a mid-channel approach.

History
At the time of the arrival of the Europeans in the early 17th century, the area near the Delaware River was inhabited by the Native American Lenape people. They called the Delaware River "Lenape Wihittuck", which means "the rapid stream of the Lenape". The Delaware River played a key factor in the economic and social development of the Mid-Atlantic region. In the seventeenth century it provided the conduit for colonial settlement by the Dutch (New Netherland), the Swedish (New Sweden). Beginning in 1664, the region became an English possession as settlement by Quakers established the colonies of Pennsylvania (including present-day Delaware) and West Jersey. In the eighteenth century, cities like Philadelphia, Camden (then Cooper's Ferry), Trenton and Wilmington, and New Castle were established upon the Delaware and their continued commercial success into the present day has been dependent on access to the river for trade and power. The river provided the path for the settlement of northeastern Pennsylvania's Lehigh Valley, and northwestern New Jersey by German Palatine immigrants—a population that became key in the agricultural development of the region.

American Revolutionary War

The strategic Delaware River was the scene of several important campaigns during the American Revolutionary War. Perhaps the most famous event was George Washington's crossing of the Delaware River with the Continental Army on the night of December 25–26, 1776, leading to a successful surprise attack and victory against the Hessian troops occupying Trenton, New Jersey on the morning of December 26.

During the Philadelphia Campaign control of the Delaware River was urgently needed by the British, allowing their naval fleet to supply troops occupying Philadelphia. To this end, the Battle of Red Bank and the Siege of Fort Mifflin were fought on and along the shores of the Delaware by the American and British navies, commanded by Commodore John Hazelwood and Admiral Francis Reynolds respectively. See historical map of that campaign.

Canals
The magnitude of the commerce of Philadelphia has made the improvements of the river below that port of great importance. Small improvements were attempted by Pennsylvania as early as 1771. Commerce was once important on the upper river, primarily prior to railway competition of 1857.

 The Delaware Division of the Pennsylvania Canal, running parallel with the river from Easton to Bristol, opened in 1830.
 The Delaware and Raritan Canal, which runs along the New Jersey side of the Delaware River from Bulls Island, New Jersey to Trenton, unites the waters of the Delaware and Raritan rivers as it empties the waters of the Delaware River via the canal outlet in New Brunswick. This canal water conduit is still used as a water supply source by the State of New Jersey.
 The Morris Canal (now abandoned and almost completely filled in) and the Delaware and Hudson Canal connected the Delaware and Hudson rivers.
 The Chesapeake and Delaware Canal joins the waters of the Delaware with those of the Chesapeake Bay.

Delaware Water Gap National Recreation Area

The Delaware Water Gap National Recreation Area came about as a result of the failure of a controversial plan to build a dam on the Delaware River at Tocks Island, just north of the Delaware Water Gap to control water levels for flood control and hydroelectric power generation. The dam would have created a  lake in the center of present park for use as a reservoir. Starting in 1960, the present-day area of the Recreation Area was acquired for the Army Corps of Engineers through eminent domain. Between 3,000 and 5,000 dwellings were demolished, including historical sites, and about 15,000 people were displaced by the project.

Because of massive environmental opposition, dwindling funds, and an unacceptable geological assessment of the dam's safety, the government transferred the property to the National Park Service in 1978. The National Park Service found itself as the caretaker of the previously endangered territory, and with the help of the federal government and surrounding communities, developed recreational facilities and worked to preserve the remaining historical structures.

The nearby Shawnee Inn, was identified in the 1990s as the only resort along the banks of the Delaware River. America Rivers, an environmental advocacy group, named the Delaware River as the river of the year for 2020.

Commerce

Wine regions

In 1984, the U.S. Department of the Treasury authorized the creation of a wine region or "American Viticultural Area" called the Central Delaware Valley AVA located in southeastern Pennsylvania and New Jersey. The wine appellation includes  surrounding the Delaware River north of Philadelphia and Trenton, New Jersey. In Pennsylvania, it consists of the territory along the Delaware River in Bucks County; in New Jersey, the AVA spans along the river in Hunterdon County and Mercer County from Titusville, New Jersey, just north of Trenton, northward to Musconetcong Mountain. As of 2013, there are no New Jersey wineries in the Central Delaware Valley AVA.

Shipping

There is an effort underway to deepen the 102.5-mile stretch of this federal navigation channel, from Philadelphia and Camden to the mouth of the Delaware Bay to 45 feet.

The Delaware River port complex refers to the ports and energy facilities along the river in the tri-state PA-NJ-DE Delaware Valley region. They include the Port of Salem, the Port of Wilmington, the Port of Chester, the Port of Paulsboro, the Port of Philadelphia and the Port of Camden. Combined they create one of the largest shipping areas of the United States. In 2015, the ports of Philadelphia, Camden, and Wilmington handled 100 million tons of cargo from 2,243 ship arrivals, and supported 135,000 direct or indirect jobs. The biggest category of imports was fruit, carried by 490 ships, followed by petroleum, and containers, with 410 and 381 ships, respectively. The biggest category of exports was of shipping was containers, with 470 ships.
 In 2016, 2,427 ships arrived at Delaware River port facilities. Fruit ships were counted at 577, petroleum at 474, and containerized cargo at 431.

At one time it was a center for petroleum and chemical products and included facilities such as the Delaware City Refinery, the Dupont Chambers Works, Oceanport Terminal at Claymont, the Marcus Hook Refinery, the Trainer Refinery, the Paulsboro Asphalt Refinery, Paulsboro Refinery, Eagle Point Refinery, and Sunoco Fort Mifflin. As of 2011, crude oil was the largest single commodity transported on the Delaware River, accounting for half of all annual cargo tonnage.

Crossings

The Delaware River is a major barrier to travel between New Jersey and Pennsylvania. Most of the larger bridges are tolled only westbound, and are owned by the Delaware River and Bay Authority, Delaware River Port Authority, Burlington County Bridge Commission or Delaware River Joint Toll Bridge Commission.

Environmental issues

New York City water supply

After New York City built 15 reservoirs to supply water to the city's growing population, it was unable to obtain permission to build an additional five reservoirs along the Delaware River's tributaries. As a result, in 1928 the city decided to draw water from the Delaware River, putting them in direct conflict with villages and towns across the river in Pennsylvania which were already using the Delaware for their water supply. The two sides eventually took their case to the U.S. Supreme Court, and in 1931, New York City was allowed to draw  of water a day from the Delaware and its upstream tributaries.

Pollution
The Delaware River has been attached to areas of high pollution. The Delaware River in 2012 was named the 5th most polluted river in the United States, explained by PennEnvironment and Environment New Jersey. The activist groups claim that there is about 7–10 million pounds of toxic chemicals flowing through the waterways due to dumping by DuPont Chambers Works. PennEnvironment also claims that the pollutants in the river can cause birth defects, infertility among women, and have been linked to cancer.

In 2015, the EPA saw the Delaware River as a concern for mass pollution especially in the Greater Philadelphia and Chester, Pennsylvania area. The EPA was involved after accusations that the river met standards made illegal by the Clean Water Act. In complying with the Clean Water Act, the EPA involved the Delaware County Regional Water Authority (DELCORA) where they set up a plan to spend around $200 million to help rid the waterway of about 740 million gallons of sewage and pollution. DELCORA was also fined about $1.4 million for allowing the Delaware River to have so much pollution residing in the river in the first place and for not complying with the Clean Water Act.

The Clean Water Act explains the importance of low pollution for human and species health. One of the sectors in the Clean Water Act explains how conditions of the river should be stable enough for human fishing and swimming. Even though the river has had success with the cleanup of pollution, the Delaware River still does not meet that standard of swimmable or fishable conditions in the Philadelphia/ Chester region.

Flooding
With the failure of the dam project to come to fruition, the lack of flood control on the river left it vulnerable, and it has experienced a number of serious flooding events as the result of snow melt or rain run-off from heavy rainstorms. Record flooding occurred in August 1955, in the aftermath of the passing of the remnants of two separate hurricanes over the area within less than a week: first Hurricane Connie and then Hurricane Diane, which was, and still is, the wettest tropical cyclone to have hit the northeastern United States.

More recently, moderate to severe flooding has occurred along the river.

Since the upper Delaware basin has few population centers along its banks, flooding in this area mainly affects natural unpopulated flood plains. Residents in the middle part of the Delaware basin experience flooding, including three major floods in the three years (2004–2006) that have severely damaged their homes and land. The lower part of the Delaware basin from Philadelphia southward to the Delaware Bay is tidal and much wider than portions further north, and is not prone to river-related flooding (although tidal surges can cause minor flooding in this area).

The Delaware River Basin Commission, along with local governments, is working to try to address the issue of flooding along the river. As the past few years have seen a rise in catastrophic floods, most residents of the river basin feel that something must be done. The local governments have worked in association with FEMA to address many of these problems, however, due to insufficient federal funds, progress is slow.

Oil spills
A number of oil spills have taken place in the Delaware over the years.
 Sep 28, 1985 –  of crude oil spilled from the Grand Eagle tanker after running aground on Marcus Hook Bar
 Jun 24, 1989 –  of crude oil spilled from the Presidente Rivera tanker after running aground on Claymont Shoal
 Nov 26, 2004 –  of crude oil spilled from the Athos 1 tanker; the tanker's hull had been punctured by a submerged, discarded anchor at the Port of Paulsboro. In 2020, the Supreme Court ruled that Citgo had failed to provide a safe berth for the vessel and was therefore jointly responsible for clean up costs. The company was ordered to pay $143 million.

Atlantic sturgeon
The National Marine Fisheries Service  is considering designating sixteen rivers as endangered habitat for the Atlantic sturgeon which would require more attention to be given to uses of the rivers that affect the fish.

National Wild and Scenic River
The river is part of the National Wild and Scenic Rivers System.

See also

 Foul Rift, rapids just south of Belvidere, New Jersey
 List of municipalities on the Delaware River
 List of crossings of the Delaware River
 List of rivers of Delaware
 List of rivers of New Jersey
 List of rivers of New York
 List of rivers of Pennsylvania
 Partnership for the Delaware Estuary
 Upper Delaware Scenic and Recreational River
 Geography of Pennsylvania

Notes

References

 Devastation on the Delaware: Stories and Images of the Deadly Flood of 1955 (2005, Word Forge Books, Ferndale, PA) The only comprehensive documentary of this weather disaster in the Delaware River Valley.

External links

 Delaware Riverkeeper Network
 Delaware River Basin Commission
 Delaware River Vessel Reporting System
 National Park Service: Delaware Water Gap National Recreation Area
 National Park Service: Upper Delaware Scenic & Recreational River
 National Park Service: Lower Delaware Wild & Scenic River
 U.S. Geological Survey: NJ stream gaging stations
 U.S. Geological Survey: NY stream gaging stations
 U.S. Geological Survey: PA stream gaging stations

Historical content
 Marine Railway and Sectional Floating Dry Dock, Delaware River, Philadelphia, 1893 by D.J. Kennedy, Historical Society of Pennsylvania 
 Winter on the River Delaware, 1856. Shows "U.S.S. Powhatan" by D.J. Kennedy, HSP 
 "Map of the South River in New Netherland" from ca. 1639 via the World Digital Library
 Socioeconomic Value of the Delaware River Basin in Delaware, New Jersey, New York, and Pennsylvania

Encyclopedias
 
 
 

 
Rivers of Delaware
Rivers of Maryland
Rivers of New Jersey
Rivers of New York (state)
Rivers of Pennsylvania
Delaware River
Rivers of Wayne County, Pennsylvania
Rivers of Pike County, Pennsylvania
Rivers of Monroe County, Pennsylvania
Rivers of Bucks County, Pennsylvania
Rivers of Delaware County, Pennsylvania
Rivers of Northampton County, Pennsylvania
Rivers of Sussex County, New Jersey
Rivers of Warren County, New Jersey
Rivers of Hunterdon County, New Jersey
Rivers of Mercer County, New Jersey
Rivers of Burlington County, New Jersey
Rivers of Camden County, New Jersey
Rivers of Gloucester County, New Jersey
Rivers of Salem County, New Jersey
Rivers of Orange County, New York
Rivers of Delaware County, New York
Rivers of Sullivan County, New York
Rivers of New Castle County, Delaware
Catskill/Delaware watersheds
Delaware Valley
Delaware Water Gap National Recreation Area
Rivers of Philadelphia
Borders of New York (state)
Borders of Delaware
Borders of Maryland
Borders of New Jersey
Borders of Pennsylvania